Aziza Jalal (Aziza Jalal; born 15 December 1958) is a Moroccan Arabic pop singer and actress.

Career 

Aziza Jalal is an iconic Arabic singer from Morocco, she currently lives in Saudi Arabia and is a Saudi national.
Before fame and marriage, the singer dedicated  her life to the study of music. Young Aziza Jalal studied music in Meknes before participating in a singing competition called Mawahib (Talents)  supervised by renowned Moroccan singer Abdelnabi Al Jirari in 1975. During the competition, the singer performed songs of well-known Egyptian and international Arab icons, such as Shadia and Ismahan. 
In a singing career that lasted from 1975 to 1985, Aziza Jalal became a popular classical singers across the Arab world before deciding to give up the artistic scene for a life of piety with a Saudi husband. She was known to be King Hassan II of Morocco's favourite singer, and often appeared on Moroccan television and at state occasions singing nationalistic, pan-Arab, and Islamic-themed material.

The singer had made a name for herself as one of the top Arab singers in the 70s and 80s. Not too little to late, her vocals have made headlines again as she astonished the world by  singing a few verses from her song during the television show.
Jalal’s song “Mestaniyak” was covered by Lebanese singer Nancy Ajram, one of the most popular Arab artists. The song’s lyrics come from the repertoire of the great Egyptian musician Mohamed Abdelouahab. The composer of the song was renowned musician Baligh Hamdi.

Aziza Jalal, however, had several other famous songs, including Min Hakek T’atebny (You have the right to blame me,) and Houa El Hob Le’baa (Love is a Game.)

Jalal’s early songs achieved commercial success in the UAE and in Egypt, and with the help of songwriter and poet Abdel Wahab Mohammed and artist Sayed Makkawi, among others, she quickly became a household name in the entire Arab world.

Retired at 26  

In 1985, Aziza Jalal chose to leave the stage. Aziza Jalal married a Saudi businessman Ali bin Butti al-Ghamdi who gave her the right to decide whether or not she wants to retire. She didn't think much into it and decided to leave. She stated that wasn't a decision she regrets.
The proposal suddenly ended her career in the music industry, leaving her fans disappointed, knowing that she could have added even more hits to her already impressive list of songs.

Returned to stage 2019 
May 22, 2019 marked a surprise for the Arab World. It was the day that Moroccans and fans across the Arab world had the chance to meet again with the prominent Moroccan arabic singer, Aziza Jalal, who was out of the spotlight for 34 years. The singer made her first appearance since 1985 on a television show aired by MBC television channel. The TV show is called “Likaa mina sifr” or “meeting from scratch.”

In the show, the singer also wowed audiences across the world when she performed her legendary song “Mestanyak,” translated as “I am waiting for you” in English, with the same passion and maybe a little bit more.

The interview with Aziza Jalal was also posted by the television show on YouTube. The interview generated more than 1 million views and thousand of comments.

After a 34-year hiatus, Jalal returned to the stage on Thursday 26 December 2019 at Winter at Tantora.
Jalal's much anticipated performance started at 10 p.m. 
Aziza Jalal, who has kept a low profile for more than 30 years, rekindled emotions as generations were enchanted by her voice and songs. 
She thanked her fans “for coming to see me after a long hiatus. I’ve never been away from you, you have always been in my heart. I'm back today because of your love for me. I decided to come back to participate in these joyful events in our country.” 

During the concert, Aziza Jalal performed “Love is not a game” composed by Muhammad Al-Mouji and written by Mamoun Al-Shinawai, and "Waiting for you (Mestaniyak) which the audience enjoyed immensely. She also performed many of her classics. Her message to the youth was: “Hear us out because we are the past, and the past needs the present and the future, hear us out so that we hear you out.”.

Discography

Studio albums

References

Further reading 
 Pop Culture in North Africa and the Middle East: Entertainment and Society around the World, by Andrew Hammond, Series: Entertainment and Society around the World, 2017 - 319 pages. , 978-1440833830
 الرماد والموسيقى: حفريات في ذاكرة غنائية عربية,  واصل، أحمد, دار الفرابي، 2009 - , 9789953713342- 
 Alif bāʼ, Volume 10, by Karīm Irāqī, Publisher, Dār al-Jamāhīr lil-Ṣiḥāfah, 1977, Indiana University - Digitized on 16 July 2010 
 Iraqi Maqam voices of women: an analytical study of the critical technical experience of Iraqi women in singing Almqami, by Hussein Azami, by Hussein Azami, AIRP, 2005 - 316 pages. , 9789953366777
 Songs and stories, by Karīm Irāqī, by Karīm Irāqī, Company Whites of Arts and Letters, Volume 1, Aghānī wa-ḥikāyātuhā, Karīm ʻIrāqī -
 La condition de la femme au Maroc, by Abderrazak Moulay Rchid, Volume 33 of Collection de la Faculté des sciences juridiques, économiques et sociales: Série de langue française Issue 33 of Collection: Série de langue française, Jamiʻat Muḥammad V. Kullīyat al-Huqūq wa-al-ʻUlūm al-Iqtisādiyah wa-al-Siyāsiyah, Editions de la Faculté des sciences juridiques, économiques, et sociales de Rabat, 1985 - . 

1958 births
Living people
Singers who perform in Classical Arabic
Singers who perform in Egyptian Arabic
20th-century Moroccan women singers
20th-century Saudi Arabian women singers
21st-century Saudi Arabian women singers
Moroccan film actresses
Moroccan television actresses
Saudi Arabian film actresses
Saudi Arabian television actresses